Appointment at the Tower (translit. Maww’ed fi el bourg aliases: Rendezvous in the Tower or A Date on the Tower or Meeting at the Tower) is a 1962 Egyptian film written and directed by Ezz El-Dine Zulficar. The film stars Salah Zulfikar, Soad Hosny and Fouad El-Mohandes.

Synopsis 
Adel and Amaal meet while they return from a cruise, love binds them, they pledge to marry after six months and that the date will be at the Cairo Tower. They plan to seize Amaal's fiancé's money. Adel decides to look for an honorable job. He works in a small job in a hotel and becomes a deputy manager. At the same time, Amaal leaves her fiancé. She is dismissed from her job as a hostess because of her brother Alaa's crimes. Six months ends. The police storms Alaa's apartment, who gets killed in the end, Adel and Amaal meet in the Cairo Tower on time.

Crew 
 Director: Ezz El-Dine Zulficar
 Writer: Ezz El-Dine Zulficar, Mohamed Abu Youssef
 Producer: Salah Zulfikar
 Cinematography: Masood Issa
 Production studio: Salah Zulfikar Films
 Distribution company: Arab Company for Cinema

Cast

Primary cast 
 Salah Zulfikar as Adel Refaat
 Soad Hosny as Amaal
 Fouad El-Mohandes as Hassan
 Soraya Helmy as Ship passenger
 Zain El-Ashmawy as Alaa
 Samia Rushdi as Khadija Hanim
 Helmy Halim as Mamdouh
 Mahmoud Farag as Madbouly El-Eter
 Eileen Gaber as Moushira Hanim

Supporting cast 
 Edmond Toima
 Ahmad Shawqi
 Zainab Sedky
 Zaki Ibrahim
 Salah Al-Masry
 Hassan Atleh
 Ahmed Shokry

See also 
 Salah Zulfikar filmography
 Soad Hosny filmography
 List of Egyptian films of the 1960s

References

External links 

 
 Appointment at the Tower on elCinema

1962 films
20th-century Egyptian films
Films shot in Egypt
1960s Arabic-language films
Egyptian black-and-white films
Films directed by Ezz El-Dine Zulficar